Tingena honesta is a species of moth in the family Oecophoridae. It is endemic to New Zealand and can be found in the South Island.

Taxonomy 
This species was first described by Alfred Philpott using specimens collected at Lake Tekapo and Lake Pukaki in December and named Borkhausenia honesta. In 1939 George Hudson discussed and illustrated this species in his book A supplement to the butterflies and moths of New Zealand using the same name. In 1988 J. S. Dugdale placed this species in the genus Tingena. The male holotype specimen is held at the New Zealand Arthropod Collection.

Description 

Philpott described this species as follows:
This species is similar in appearance to T. ancogramma but is paler.

Distribution
This species is endemic to New Zealand and has been observed in the South Island.

Behaviour 
The adult moths are on the wing in December.

References

Oecophoridae
Moths of New Zealand
Moths described in 1929
Endemic fauna of New Zealand
Taxa named by Alfred Philpott
Endemic moths of New Zealand